Ndagire is a surname. Notable people with the surname include:

Florence Ndagire (born 1984), Ugandan lawyer
Mariam Ndagire (born 1971), Ugandan singer, actress, playwright, film director, and producer
Specioza Kimera Ndagire, Ugandan businesswoman

Bantu-language surnames